The Church of St Martin in Worle within the English county of Somerset has Norman origins. It is a Grade II* listed building.

History
St Martin's Church was built in 1125 and rebuilt during the 14th and 15th centuries, with major restoration and extension work in 1870. It is a Grade II* listed building.

Following the dissolution of the monasteries the carved misericords from Woodspring Priory were moved to St Martin's.

The Church is now ecumenical, with Methodist as well as Church of England ministers. The parish and benefice of Worle is within the Diocese of Bath and Wells.

Architecture

The stone building has a tiled roof and consists of a four bay nave, chancel and north aisle. The three-stage tower is supported by angle buttresses.

See also
 List of ecclesiastical parishes in the Diocese of Bath and Wells

References

External links

 Church web site

Grade II* listed buildings in North Somerset
Grade II* listed churches in Somerset